The Catholic Library Association is an international membership organization, providing its members professional development through educational and networking experiences, publications, scholarships, and other services. The Catholic Library Association coordinates the exchange of ideas, provides a source of inspirational support and guidance in ethical issues related to librarianship, and offers fellowship for those who seek, serve, preserve, and share the word in all its forms.

History

The Catholic Library Association began in 1921, as a section of the National Catholic Educational Association. Rev. Paul J. Foik, CSC, of University of Notre Dame, was chair. It became an independent organization in 1929. Francis E. Fitzgerald was the first president (1929-1931).

The Association celebrated its Golden anniversary at its Cincinnati conference in 1971. The Centennial was marked in 2021 with an article in Catholic Library World which highlighted milestones such as Catholic Book Week, collaborative efforts with the Catholic Research Resources Alliance, and conference speakers.

The Catholic Library Association is an affiliate of the American Library Association.

Publications

Catholic Library World
 Catholic Periodical and Literature Index established in 1933. Continued after 2011 by the American Theological Library Association.

Awards
Regina Medal est. 1959, recognizes one living person for "continued, distinguished contribution to children's literature without regard to the nature of the contribution." Regina Award Medalists include Anne Carroll Moore, Augusta Baker, Theodor Seuss Geisel, Tomie dePaola, Madeleine L'Engle, and Eric Carle.
St. Katharine Drexel Award est. 1966, recognizes an outstanding contribution to the growth of high school librarianship. 
John Brubaker Award est. 1978, to recognize an outstanding work of literary merit, considered on the basis of its significant interest to the library profession which was published in Catholic Library World. Tim Senapatiratne, director of the Spencer Library at the United Theological Seminary of the Twin Cities received the 2021-2022 John Brubaker Award for “What is Metaliteracy?: Using the Concepts of Metaliteracy in Theological Librarianship.” 
Aggiornamento Award, est. 1980, is presented by the Parish and Community Library Services Section in recognition of an outstanding contribution made by an individual or an organization for the renewal of parish and community life in the spirit of Pope John XXIII (1881-1963).
Jerome Award, est. 1992, is presented by the Academic Libraries, Archives, and Library Education Section in recognition of outstanding contribution and commitment to excellence in scholarship which embody the ideals of the Catholic Library Association. It is named after St.Jerome, Doctor of the Church (331-420), patron of librarians.

References

External links
 Official website
 Archives of the Catholic Library Association at Marquette University

Library associations
Catholics
Catholicism
Catholic education
Catholicism and society
Library-related professional associations
Library-related organizations
Library science journals